Emilie Bigelow Hapgood (1868 in Chicago-February 15, 1930, in Rome) was a theatrical producer in New York City, and was at one time the president of the Stage Society. She founded the Circle of War Relief for Negro Soldiers in November 1917 during World War I, and led it for some time. She herself was white. She married Norman Hapgood in 1896; they were divorced in 1915. Georgia Douglas Johnson wrote a poem titled "TO EMILIE BIGELOW HAPGOOD -  PHILANTHROPIST", which Johnson included in Bronze: A Book of Verse, published in 1922.

References

1930 deaths
American philanthropists
American theatre managers and producers